Martina Santandrea (born 5 September 1999) is an Italian group rhythmic gymnast. She is a member of the national squad since 2016. 

She is the 2020 Olympic Group All-around bronze medalist, the 2018 World Group All-around silver medalist and two-time European (2018) Group All-around silver medalist.

Detailed Olympic results

References

External links 
 

1999 births
Living people
Italian rhythmic gymnasts
European Games competitors for Italy
Gymnasts at the 2019 European Games
Medalists at the Rhythmic Gymnastics European Championships
Medalists at the Rhythmic Gymnastics World Championships
Gymnasts at the 2020 Summer Olympics
Olympic gymnasts of Italy
Medalists at the 2020 Summer Olympics
Olympic bronze medalists for Italy
Olympic medalists in gymnastics
21st-century Italian women